Barrueco is a surname. Notable people with the surname include:

Barrueco (musician) (born Wilfried Ange Barrueco in 1974), French pop singer-songwriter
Manuel Barrueco (born 1952), Cuban classical guitarist
Ricardo Fernández Barrueco (born 1965), Venezuelan businessman